Thomas Cosmades (29 April 1924 in Istanbul – 20 September 2010) was a Turkish-born ethnic-Greek, later American national, Evangelical preacher and translator of New Testament in Turkish.

Cosmades was born of Greek parentage and served in the Turkish army during the Second World War. In 1949  he served as translator for American Aaron J. Smith during searches for Noah's Ark in Ararat. In 1950 he left Turkey for the USA, followed by evangelical work in the Lebanon and then from 1968 was based in Germany as missionary at large for The Evangelical Alliance Mission.

References

1924 births
2010 deaths
Translators of the Bible into Turkish
Turkish people of Greek descent
20th-century translators
Turkish emigrants to the United States